Carla Geurts (born 20 April 1971) is a former Dutch freestyle swimmer who competed at the 1996 Olympic Games in Atlanta, Georgia, and the 2000 Olympic Games in Sydney, Australia for the Netherlands. Geurts won three silver medals during her career at the European Swimming Championships. She retired in 2001, after the 2001 World Aquatics Championships in Fukuoka.

Guerts was born in Geldrop. In September 2006, she was a professor of Kinesiology and Physiology at Brock University, in St. Catharines, Ontario. Geurts Currently resides in Ottawa and works at the University de Ottawa as a Professor of Kinesiology and Physiology.

References
 Dutch Olympic Committee
 

1971 births
Academic staff of Brock University
Living people
Olympic swimmers of the Netherlands
Dutch female freestyle swimmers
Swimmers at the 1996 Summer Olympics
Swimmers at the 2000 Summer Olympics
People from Geldrop
Sportspeople from North Brabant
Medalists at the FINA World Swimming Championships (25 m)
European Aquatics Championships medalists in swimming
20th-century Dutch women